Warren Township, Ohio may refer to:

Warren Township, Belmont County, Ohio
Warren Township, Jefferson County, Ohio
Warren Township, Trumbull County, Ohio
Warren Township, Tuscarawas County, Ohio
Warren Township, Washington County, Ohio

See also
Warren Township (disambiguation)

Ohio township disambiguation pages